In Greek mythology, Erato (Ancient Greek: Ἐρατώ, Eratō; 'desired, lovely') was the name of the following individuals.
 Erato, one of the 50 Nereids, sea-nymph daughters of the 'Old Man of the Sea' Nereus and the Oceanid Doris. Her name means 'the awakener of desire'.
Erato, one of the Greek Muses.
 Erato, one of the Nymphs Dodonides (Nysiades), nurses of Dionysus in Mount Nysa.
 Erato, a Libyan princess, was one of the daughters of King Danaus and naiad Polyxo. Under the command of their father, along with her sisters except Hypermnestra, Erato married and murdered her husband Bromios or Eudaemon at the night of their wedding.
 Erato, the dryad wife of Arcas.
 Erato, a Thespian princess as one of the 50 daughters of King Thespius and Megamede or by one of his many wives. When Heracles hunted and ultimately slayed the Cithaeronian lion, Erato with her other sisters, except for one, all laid with the hero in a night, a week or for 50 days as what their father strongly desired it to be. Erato bore Heracles a son, Dynastes.

Notes

References 
 Apollodorus, The Library with an English Translation by Sir James George Frazer, F.B.A., F.R.S. in 2 Volumes, Cambridge, MA, Harvard University Press; London, William Heinemann Ltd. 1921. ISBN 0-674-99135-4. Online version at the Perseus Digital Library. Greek text available from the same website.

 Athenaeus of Naucratis, The Deipnosophists or Banquet of the Learned. London. Henry G. Bohn, York Street, Covent Garden. 1854. Online version at the Perseus Digital Library.
 Athenaeus of Naucratis, Deipnosophistae. Kaibel. In Aedibus B.G. Teubneri. Lipsiae. 1887. Greek text available at the Perseus Digital Library.
 Diodorus Siculus, The Library of History translated by Charles Henry Oldfather. Twelve volumes. Loeb Classical Library. Cambridge, Massachusetts: Harvard University Press; London: William Heinemann, Ltd. 1989. Vol. 3. Books 4.59–8. Online version at Bill Thayer's Web Site
 Diodorus Siculus, Bibliotheca Historica. Vol 1-2. Immanel Bekker. Ludwig Dindorf. Friedrich Vogel. in aedibus B. G. Teubneri. Leipzig. 1888-1890. Greek text available at the Perseus Digital Library.

Gaius Julius Hyginus, Fabulae from The Myths of Hyginus translated and edited by Mary Grant. University of Kansas Publications in Humanistic Studies. Online version at the Topos Text Project.
 Hesiod, Theogony from The Homeric Hymns and Homerica with an English Translation by Hugh G. Evelyn-White, Cambridge, MA.,Harvard University Press; London, William Heinemann Ltd. 1914. Online version at the Perseus Digital Library. Greek text available from the same website.
 Kerényi, Carl, The Gods of the Greeks, Thames and Hudson, London, 1951.
Pausanias, Description of Greece with an English Translation by W.H.S. Jones, Litt.D., and H.A. Ormerod, M.A., in 4 Volumes. Cambridge, MA, Harvard University Press; London, William Heinemann Ltd. 1918. . Online version at the Perseus Digital Library
 Pausanias, Graeciae Descriptio. 3 vols. Leipzig, Teubner. 1903.  Greek text available at the Perseus Digital Library.
Tzetzes, John, Book of Histories, Book II-IV translated by Gary Berkowitz from the original Greek of T. Kiessling's edition of 1826. Online version at theio.com

Nereids
Danaids
Women of Heracles
Princesses in Greek mythology